Sakura Genesis is an annual professional wrestling event promoted by New Japan Pro-Wrestling (NJPW) since 2013.

Held annually at Tokyo's Ryōgoku Kokugikan, the event has been nicknamed . Originally known as Invasion Attack, the event was renamed in 2017 after the sakura, in English "cherry blossom", which blooms in early April. The event is followed by the New Japan Cup, with the main event being the winner of the New Japan Cup against the champion of their choice, usually being the IWGP Heavyweight Champion. The event was not held in 2019, the NJPW-Ring of Honor co-produced G1 Supercard event was held instead. The event was originally scheduled to take place in 2020 on March 31, but was cancelled due to the COVID-19 pandemic. In 2022, the annual April event in Ryōgoku Kokugikan will not use the Sakura Genesis name, instead using the name Hyper Battle which was the name of series of events from 1993 until 2004, this due NJPW using names from old events for their 50th anniversary. 

The event has aired domestically as a pay-per-view (PPV). From 2013 to 2014, the event aired internationally as an internet pay-per-view (iPPV) and since 2015, it has aired worldwide on NJPW's internet streaming site, NJPW World.

Events

See also

List of New Japan Pro-Wrestling pay-per-view events

References

External links
The official New Japan Pro-Wrestling website
Invasion Attack at ProWrestlingHistory.com